Long Live Rock 'n' Roll is the debut album by Serbian heavy metal band Kraljevski Apartman released in 1997. With the support of Riblja Čorba members Zoran Zdravković, former Apartman 69 guitarist, decided to form a new band and started writing new material. The opening track on the album is a cover version of Rainbow hit "Long Live Rock 'n' Roll". Promotional video was recorded for the song "Misterija". Four tracks from the album were included as bonus tracks on the band's next album -Izgubljen u vremenu. Live version of "Misterija" was included on the Best of Live (1996–2005) album.

Track listing 
All songs were written by Zoran Zdravković except where noted.

"Long Live Rock 'n' Roll" (R. Blackmore, Z. Zdravković) - 3:43
"Gore digni glavu" (Z. Zdravković, Z. Lalović) - 3:48
"Mračan grad" - 4:27
"Ne verujem u lažne anđele" - 6:04
"Gradski ratnici" - 3:39
"Misterija" - 4:53
"Oprosti mi..." (Z. Zdravković, Z. Lalović) - 4:57
"Demonske oči" - 4:10

Personnel 
Zoran Lalović - vocals
Zoran Zdravković - guitar
Zoran Rončević - drums
Nebojša Čanković - guitar
Vladimir Rajčić - bass

Kraljevski Apartman albums
1997 albums